The men's 4 × 100 metres relay event at the 1983 Summer Universiade was held at the Commonwealth Stadium in Edmonton on 10 and 11 July 1983.

Results

Heats

Final

References

Athletics at the 1983 Summer Universiade
1983